Gearum is genus of flowering plants in the family Araceae. It contains only one described species, Gearum brasiliense, native to central Brazil (States of Tocantins + Mato Grosso).

References

Aroideae
Monotypic Araceae genera
Endemic flora of Brazil
Taxa named by N. E. Brown